The Angolan vlei rat (Otomys anchietae) is a species of rodent in the family Muridae.
It is found only in Angola.
Its natural habitats are dry savanna, moist savanna, and subtropical or tropical seasonally wet or flooded lowland grassland.
It is threatened by habitat loss.

References

Otomys
Mammals of Angola
Endemic fauna of Angola
Mammals described in 1882
Taxa named by José Vicente Barbosa du Bocage
Taxonomy articles created by Polbot